Netani Suka, also known by the nickname of "T", is a Fijian professional rugby league footballer who currently plays for the Wentworthville Magpies in the Bundaberg Red Cup. He is a Fijian international. He has previously played Premier League for the Wests Tigers and Penrith Panthers and for the Gateshead Thunder in National League Two.

He was named in the Fiji training squad for the 2008 Rugby League World Cup and played for Fiji Bati ahead of the 2013 Rugby League World Cup.

References

External links
Gateshead Thunder profile
Thunder squad is coming together

Living people
Fijian rugby league players
Fiji national rugby league team players
Newcastle Thunder players
Wentworthville Magpies players
I-Taukei Fijian people
Wests Tigers NSW Cup players
Rugby league second-rows
Rugby league props
Year of birth missing (living people)